Shilan may refer to:
 Shilan, Gilan
 Shilan, Kurdistan
 Shilan, Baneh, Kurdistan Province
 Shilan Town (石栏镇), a town of Huayuan County, Hunan, China.